Château épiscopal de Lauterbourg is a monumental building in the town of Lauterbourg, in the department of Bas-Rhin, Alsace, France. It was built at the end of the 16th century, and served as a residence of the bishop of Speyer. It is a listed historical monument since 1932.

References

Châteaux in Bas-Rhin
Monuments historiques of Bas-Rhin